This is a list of lighthouses in Kiribati, an island nation in the central Pacific Ocean.

Lighthouses

See also
 Lists of lighthouses and lightvessels

References

External links
 

Kiribati
Lighthouses